The 1948 United States presidential election in Michigan took place on November 2, 1948, as part of the 1948 United States presidential election. Voters chose 19 representatives, or electors, to the Electoral College, who voted for president and vice president.

Michigan was won by Governor Thomas E. Dewey (R–New York), running with Governor Earl Warren, with 49.23% of the popular vote, against incumbent President Harry S. Truman (D–Missouri), running with Senator Alben W. Barkley, with 47.57% of the popular vote.

Michigan weighed in for this election as around 7% more Republican than the nation-at-large. Dewey’s victory was the first of three consecutive Republican victories in the state, as Michigan would not vote for a Democratic candidate again until John F. Kennedy narrowly won the state in 1960.

Results

Results by county

See also
 United States presidential elections in Michigan

References

Michigan
1948
1948 Michigan elections